Ursula Goltz is a German computer scientist, professor emerita at the Technical University of Braunschweig, formerly affiliated with the Institute for Programming and Reactive Systems there, and former coordinator of a German Research Foundation program on long-lasting software systems. Her research concerns the theory of concurrent computing, including the use of Petri nets to model concurrent systems.

Goltz earned her Ph.D. at RWTH Aachen University in 1988, with the dissertation, Über die Darstellung von CCS-Programmen durch Petrinetze.

In the theory of concurrent systems, she is known for introducing the concept of action refinement, an analogue of Niklaus Wirth's concept of stepwise refinement in the development of software systems, together with Rob van Glabbeek. She is also one of the developers of Arden2ByteCode, a compiler for the Arden syntax for representing medical knowledge.

References

Year of birth missing (living people)
Living people
German computer scientists
German women computer scientists
RWTH Aachen University alumni
Academic staff of the Technical University of Braunschweig